Rise is a village in Arendal municipality in Agder county, Norway. The village is located on the eastern short of the river Nidelva, along the Arendalsbanen railway line. The Norwegian County Road 408 runs through the village.

References

Villages in Agder
Arendal